The 2012 Worcester City Council election took place on 3 May 2012 to elect members of Worcester City Council in England. This was on the same day as other 2012 United Kingdom local elections.

After the election, the composition of the council was:
Conservative 17
Labour 15
Liberal Democrats 2
Green 1

Ward results
The results were:

References

2012 English local elections
2012
2010s in Worcestershire